Keene Adventist Elementary School (KAES) is a Seventh-day Adventist co-educational PK-8 elementary school located in Keene, Texas. The school is operated by the Texas Conference of Seventh-day Adventists and the Keene Seventh-day Adventist Church to make available Christian education. It is a part of the Seventh-day Adventist education system, the world's second largest Christian school system.

History

On January 7, 1894, when "The Texas Academy" opened its doors to welcome the
first students, grades one through twelve were included. The students were separated into
two groups, the academy grades and the elementary grades. Professor C.B. Hughes was
principal for the entire student body, but devoted his time to the academy students. Mrs.
Flora Williams and her daughter taught the elementary grades. For the first few years the
salaries of the elementary teachers were paid by the state. Both groups of students were in
the same building, occupying different rooms.
The enrollment in the new school increased so rapidly that it was necessary to
erect a new building to accommodate administrative and classroom facilities. The
elementary grades were located in the new building.
As the enrollment continued to grow, the academy grades needed more
classrooms. To provide for this growth, the academy board authorized the construction of
a separated building for the elementary grades. It was named the normal building, and
was located on the north-east corner of the campus.
Through the years the elementary department of the school at Keene continued to
grow along with the academy and the college. In November 1949 after three years of
investigating and planning, work was begun on a new building for the elementary. The
new Demonstration School was built with a limited budget by student labor under the
supervision of Ed E. Seamount, builder, and J. Randall Sloop, business manager of the
college, for half of what it would have cost as a contracted job. The school later became
known as Ella E. Hughes Elementary School of Southwestern Junior College.
In 1966, the school would make one more move to its present location on pecan street and the
name changed to Keene Adventist Elementary School. The school operates as a ministry
of the Keene Seventh-day Adventist Church and provides Christian education for children
grades Pre-Kinder through eighth grade. KAES as it is also called, offers music, technology, PE to round out a strong academic program.

Governance
The school is operated by a school board and is affiliated with the Keene Seventh-day Adventist Church.

Athletic programs
Keene Adventist Elementary School's athletic programs include 
Girls and Boys JH Basketball, JH Gymnastics, JH Soccer, JH Volleyball, Girls and Boys Elementary Basketball, Elementary Soccer, Elementary Volleyball, Elementary Gymnastics.

Curriculum
The schools curriculum consists primarily of the standard courses taught at Elementary Schools and college preparatory schools across the world. All students are required to take classes in the core areas of English, Basic Sciences, Mathematics, and Social Sciences. In addition, religion classes are mandated on a yearly basis.

School Paper
The school has a weekly news publication titled KONNECTIONS for the events on campus which include classroom & Athletics Newsletters, Calendars & Announcement's.

Accreditation 
KAES is accredited by the Board of Regents of the General Conference of Seventh-day Adventists, and the Texas Private Schools Accreditation Commission (TEPSAC).

Administration
Michael Todd Coulter, Principal

Mimi Samaniego, Secretary

Lisa Turk, treasurer

Students
The student population is around 200. Upon graduation, many students continue their education at Chisholm Trail Academy. In years past there were more students attending but the population has gradually declined after the arrival of uniforms. In the 2017-2018 school year, the student population rests at 185.

See also

 List of Seventh-day Adventist secondary schools
 Seventh-day Adventist education

References

External links
 Adventist Education

Schools in Johnson County, Texas
Private elementary schools in Texas
Educational institutions established in 1893
Seventh-day Adventist education
Private middle schools in Texas
1893 establishments in Texas